Chris Donaldson (born 26 May 1975 in Auckland, New Zealand) is a New Zealand sprinter who represented his country at the 1996 and 2000 Summer Olympics. He is the son of film director Roger Donaldson. He also competed at the 1998 and 2006 Commonwealth Games. He was part of the 4 by 100m relay team that set the current national record. Currently, Chris is the strength and conditioning coach of the NZ National Cricket team. He has been appointed as the strength and conditioning coach of the IPL franchise Kolkata Knight Riders.

Personal bests

References

External links

1975 births
Living people
New Zealand people of Australian descent
New Zealand male sprinters
Commonwealth Games competitors for New Zealand
Athletes (track and field) at the 1998 Commonwealth Games
Athletes (track and field) at the 2002 Commonwealth Games
Athletes (track and field) at the 2006 Commonwealth Games
Olympic athletes of New Zealand
Athletes (track and field) at the 1996 Summer Olympics
Athletes (track and field) at the 2000 Summer Olympics
Athletes from Auckland
People educated at Logan Park High School